Buniadpur is a City and a Municipality in North Bengal in the Dakshin Dinajpur district, West Bengal, India.

Geography

Location
The municipality is located at the coordinates . It is divided into 14 wards.

In the map alongside, all places marked on the map are linked in the full screen version.

Demographics
Buniadpur Municipality has total population of 31964.

Administrator
The first election results of 14 wards of Buniadpur Municipality has been declared. The ruling Trinamool Congress (TMC) has won 13 out of 14 wards. Polling was held on 13 August 2017. The municipality is in Dakshin Dinajpur district of West Bengal. Civic elections took place for the first time in Buniadpur Municipality as the civic body was formed in 2014. Both the TMC and BJP contested polls in all the 14 wards, whereas the CPI(M) fielded candidates in 12 wards. 86.89% of the voters exercised their franchise in the elections. Several incidents of violence and booth capturing were reported during the polling.

Transport
1.Buniadpur Railway Station serves as rail transportion system for Buniadpur.
2.Buniadpur Bus Stand serves as Bus transportation system and buses are going to Kolkata, Siliguri, Alipurduar, Jalpaiguri, Coochbehar, Malda accordingly.

New broad gauge lines – Gazole-Itahar (27.20 km), Itahar-Raiganj (22.16 km) and Itahar-Buniadpur (27.095 km) – as a material modification of the Eklakhi-Balurghat project (commissioned in 2004) was included in the budget 1983-84. Initial work for the lines has been taken up by Northeast Frontier Railway. 431.973 ha of land to be acquired. Land acquisition has commenced in the Gazole-Itahar sector with initial fund sanctions. As of August 2018, further sanctions are awaited.

New broad gauge line from Kaliaganj to Buniadpur (33.10 km) was included in the budget 2010-11.  157.938 ha of land to be acquired. As of August 2018, project work by Northeast Frontier Railway held up mainly because of paucity of funds.

Education
Buniadpur Mahavidyalaya is a college located in Buniadpur, Affiliated to University of Gour Banga.
Banshihari High School is renowned school located in Buniadpur Municipality which was established in 1952.
Banshihari Balika Vidyalay is also located in Buniadpur.
Narayanpur High School, And the newly born high school, Buniadpur High School is also in Buniadpur. Buniadpur Teachers Training College (D.El.Ed,B.ED), Buniadpur Government Girls ITI, Ujjwal Kids World is also situated in Buniadpur.

Banking Facilities
State Bank of India operates its branch in Buniadpur.
Raigang Central Co-Operative Bank Ltd.
Bangiya Gramin Vikash Bank.
Bandhan Bank Pvt. Ltd.
United bank of India.

References

Cities and towns in Dakshin Dinajpur district
Cities in West Bengal